Kildwick, or Kildwick-in-Craven, is a village and civil parish of the district of Craven in North Yorkshire, England. It is situated between Skipton and Keighley and had a population of 191 in 2001,  rising slightly to 194 at the 2011 census. Kildwick is a landmark as where the major road from Keighley to Skipton crosses the River Aire. The village's amenities include a primary school, church and public house.

History

Etymology
The first known documentation of Kildwick's name is as Childeuuic in the Domesday Book. In Latin, the digraph ch is pronounced /kʰ/ not /tʃ/ so its pronunciation was the same as it is now.

The meaning of its name depends on whether it was named by the conquering Vikings or earlier in Old English. However, no evidence of the latter is known, and other place names nearby are predominantly Old Norse.

Kild. In Old Danish kilde means either a spring like in Keld  to the north, or a large smooth body of water. Kelda has its roots in ketil, cauldron, from the Proto-Germanic language kiltham, a vessel for nourishment. It is often proposed that Kild mean child since it comes from that same root. kilþei means womb in Gothic and thence Old English cild, child or kin, but the town name is not Old English but Norse and so Kild describes the floodplain of the River Aire when flooded.
Wick means a community settlement from the etymological root of Proto-Indo-European weik meaning clan, c.f. Sanskrit vit settlement; Old Iranian vis clan, house, village. In Proto-Germanic etymology, wīc or vik developed several meanings: Kildwick could mean a river port like Greenwich or a trading place like Norwich, but dairy farm does not apply for that meaning was used only in the south of England. Hence in Kildwick's case its name means river port.

Property
The Domesday Book of 1086 has the first record of Kildwick in writing. It lists the Lord of the Childeuuic manor as Arnkeld with about 240 acres (100 hectares) of ploughland and an Anglo Saxon church.

However, William the Conqueror shortly deposed all the Angle-Dane lords and rewarded his great Norman warriors. Ruling over-all in Craven was Robert de Romille. In 1120 Robert's heir Cecilia de Romille, Lady of Skipton, founded an Augustine priory at Embsay near Skipton and endowed it with the manor/estate of Kildwick. In 1153 the proprietors of Kildwick moved their priory to Bolton Abbey.

From 1305 to 1313, Bolton Priory paid for the bridge over the River Aire to be built in stone. They also built Kildwick Grange as a local residence.

In 1539, Henry VIII dissolved the monastery at Bolton and granted Kildwick manor to Robert Wilkinson and Thomas Drake of Halifax but granted the church to Christ Church, Oxford.

In 1549, Thomas Drake alienated the Manor to John Garforth of Farnhill. In 1558, the Garforths sold it all to the Currer family with whose lineal descendants it remains.

Population
 1379 Poll Tax recorded Kildwick township as having only 10 households, all paying the minimum tax.
 1672 Hearth Tax counted 25 households in the township with mostly but one fireplace, but also the 14-hearthed manor house.
 1821 parish registered 8,605 inhabitants.
 1831 parish was 9,926 however township only 190.
 1881 the parish had been divided so district down to 8,923.
 1891 district up to 9,859 but township down to 145.

St Andrew's Church

St Andrew's is a historically significant church. Fragments of 10th-century crosses have been excavated from its walls, evidence of the Anglo Saxon church built here before the Norman conquest. It was replaced by one of stone in the 12th century. Cecilia de Romille gave the church to Bolton Priory in Wharfedale, the Manor of Kildwick coming under the jurisdiction of the Priors of Bolton.

After the Battle of Bannockburn in 1314 Scots raiders sacked Bingley and Bradford Churches, but spared Keighley and Kildwick Churches because they were dedicated to St. Andrew, patron saint of Scotland. However, in 1318 the church building was badly damaged by Scottish raiders.

In 1539 Henry VIII dissolved the monastery and granted the church to Christ Church, Oxford. In the reign of Henry VIII under the patronage of Christ Church the church was almost entirely rebuilt. During the 15th and 16th centuries the church was lengthened, with further extensions eastwards so that it is now one of the longest in Yorkshire hence known locally as 'The Lang Kirk of Craven'.

The church was restored in 1873 by the Lancaster partnership of Paley and Austin. Changes have taken place since then, including extension of the chancel and a further restoration of the nave in 1901–03 by the successors in the Lancaster practice, Austin and Paley.

Charlotte Brontë and other members of the Brontë family were acquainted with the church.

Kildwick Parish

Ancient Kildwick Parish was unusually large for it included the townships of Kildwick, Bradley Both, Cononley, Cowling, Holden, Eastburn, Farnhill, Glusburn, Ikornshaw, Silsden, Steeton, Sutton and Stirton and Thorlby.

In the mid 19th century the advent of textile factories caused rapid growth of some of the townships. It became anomalous for residents of those expanding towns to have to travel to a tiny village to be baptised, married and buried. In consequence the parish was divided, for example the other side of the River Aire Sutton-in-Craven was constituted as a separate ecclesiastical district in 1869 and built its own parish church. However adjacent Cross Hills is still in the parish of Kildwick.

Education
Education in Kildwick has a substantial history. In 1563 and 1564 the Archbishop of York’s Visitation Act books records a schoolmaster at Kildwick. And the national Hearth tax of 1672 records “George Ellmott for the Freeschoole, 2 hearths” untaxed in Kildwick. In 2012 the School is adjacent to the parish church on Priest Bank Road and is known as Kildwick Church of England Voluntary Controlled Primary School. It caters for girls and boys age range 4 to 11; maximum number of pupils per grade 17.

Transport

Road

Kildwick is a landmark in Craven being the point at which the main road from Keighley to Skipton crosses the River Aire. Kildwick is made a natural crossing place by the spur of land from Crosshills that dramatically narrows a wide valley prone to flooding. This spur is a first river terrace deposit of silt and sand with gravel lenses. It has been enlarged downstream by about 60 acres (25ha) of made ground.

From 1305 to 1313 Bolton Abbey paid for "Aire-brigg" to be built in stone however wooden bridges had existed there many centuries before that. The bridge at Kildwick is the first stone bridge recorded in Craven and the oldest bridge in Airedale and has been designated a Grade I building.

The Keighley and Kendal Turnpike Trust operated from 1752 to 1878. It was promoted mostly by textile manufacturers of Settle on the grounds that transportation costs to be greatly reduced since waggons on good roads need half the number of horses required for carrying packs. It was built to a standard width of 7 yards of which 5 were metaled.

In 1780 the bridge was widened for the Turnpike and is structurally two bridges standing side‐by‐side. The upstream side with ribbed vaulting and two pointed arches is the 14th-century original. The downstream side has only plain round arches.

In 1823 the Blackburn Addingham road opened. Six stagecoaches a day passed through the area. However the Keighley Kendal Road proved a commercial failure and ceased in debt in 1878. The roads passed into the care of the County Council.

By 1968 the road traffic volume found such a bottleneck at the bridge and village it necessitated the building of the A629 and bridge to bypass it; completed in 1988.

Canal

Kildwick village is so close to the canal that they touch. In 1773 the Bingley to Skipton section was the first section of the Leeds and Liverpool Canal to be completed. By 1781 the canal joined Leeds to Gargrave, and in 1816 completed the link to Liverpool. It was of benefit for transport of supplies and goods from the textile mills that stood on the other side of the river.

Rail

In 1847 the Leeds and Bradford Extension Railway opened its Shipley to Skipton section through Kildwick and Crosshills railway station. Kildwick was thus served by rail until the station was closed in 1965. Steeton is the nearest railway station.

Main sights

Notable people
John Webster (alias Johannes Hyphastes) (1610–82), clergyman and physician, became curate at Kildwick in 1634.
Stephen Barrett (1718–1801), teacher of classics, was born at Bent, in the parish of Kildwick.
Henry Mosley (1852–1933), first-class cricketer, was born in Kildwick.
Clare Teal (1973–), English jazz singer, was born in Kildwick.

References

External links

 The Ancient Parish of Kildwick: Historical extracts and Links collected by Genuki
 Brontë Parsonage Museum in Haworth, Yorkshire

Villages in North Yorkshire
Civil parishes in North Yorkshire
Craven District